Lirosceles is an extinct genus of prehistoric ray-finned fish that lived during the Upper Miocene subepoch.

See also

 Prehistoric fish
 List of prehistoric bony fish

References

Miocene fish
Scorpaeniformes genera
Prehistoric ray-finned fish genera
Cenozoic animals of North America